Results and statistics from Maria Sharapova's 2004 tennis season.

Yearly summary

Australian Open series 
Sharapova began her season at the Australian Open, as the 28th seed. She lost in the third round to Anastasia Myskina.

Indian Wells & Miami 
Sharapova played three matches at Indian Wells and three at Miami.

European clay court season 
Sharapova reached her first Major quarter-final at the French Open, defeating 2003 quarter-finalist Vera Zvonareva en route. She eventually lost in the quarter-finals to Paola Suárez.

Grass court season 
Sharapova won her first title for the year in Birmingham, defeating Tatiana Golovin in the final in three sets. At Wimbledon, Sharapova was seeded 13th, meaning she could have faced a potential fourth round meeting against the French Open champion, Anastasia Myskina, who had defeated her in Australia earlier in the year. However, Sharapova was able to take advantage of Myskina's early exit to reach the quarter-finals, where she dropped her first set of the tournament to Ai Sugiyama, before winning in three sets. In the semi-finals, she faced 1999 champion Lindsay Davenport, trailing by a set and a break before making a comeback to prevail in three sets after the rain appeared to halt Davenport's momentum.

The final saw Sharapova face two-time defending champion Serena Williams, who had defeated her in Miami earlier in the year, in what was their first meeting. Williams entered the match as the favourite, but Sharapova would produce a stunning straight-sets victory to become the third-youngest woman (after Lottie Dod and Martina Hingis) to triumph at Wimbledon. The victory was hailed by the media as "the most stunning upset in memory". By virtue of winning Wimbledon, Sharapova would enter the Top Ten for the first time in her career, and would remain there until January 2009, when she decided not to defend her 2008 Australian Open title due to a serious shoulder injury.

US Open series 
Sharapova entered the US Open as the seventh seed, but she was defeated in the third round by Mary Pierce.

Fall series 
During the fall of the season Sharapova played and won consecutive titles at the hansol korea open and at the japan tennis championships thus extending her title tally to 4 .She also reached the final of the zurich open defeating venus williams en route but eventually lost to alicia molik in three tight sets.

WTA Tour Championships 
Sharapova qualified for the year-end WTA Tour Championships by virtue of her impressive season, which saw her capture four titles for the year to date. She was drawn in the Black Group along with Amélie Mauresmo, US Open champion Svetlana Kuznetsova and Vera Zvonareva. Sharapova won two of her three matches, the only loss coming to Mauresmo in her first match. Sharapova qualified for the semi-finals after finishing second in the group behind Mauresmo; thus, the semi-final saw her drawn against French Open champion and Red Group leader Anastasia Myskina, which she won in three sets.

The final saw her up against Serena Williams for the third time in the year. After losing the first set, and trailing 0–4 in the final set, Sharapova defeated her for the second (and to date last) time this year, to become the second player in WTA Tour Championships history to win the title on her first attempt (Petra Kvitová would later achieve this feat in 2011, Dominika Cibulková in 2016 and Ashleigh Barty in 2019). She would finish the year ranked World No. 4, and be recognised by the WTA as the "Player of the Year" and "Most Improved Player of the Year". Additionally, she would earn $2,506,263 in prize money, the most by any player this year.

All matches 

This table chronicles all the matches of Sharapova in 2004, including walkovers (W/O) which the WTA does not count as wins. They are marked ND for non-decision or no decision.

Singles matches

Doubles matches

Tournament schedule

Singles Schedule

Yearly Records

Head-to-head matchups

Finals

Singles: 6 (5–1)

See also 
 2004 Serena Williams tennis season
 2004 WTA Tour

References

External links 

Maria Sharapova tennis seasons
Sharapova, Maria
2004 in Russian tennis